Matt Ford may refer to:
 Matt Ford (baseball), American baseball pitcher
 Matt Ford (cricketer), Irish cricketer
 Matt Ford (golfer) (born 1978), English golfer
 Matt Ford (lighting designer), American lighting designer 
 Matthew Ford (ice hockey) (born 1984), American professional ice hockey forward
 Matthew Ford (footballer) (born 1973), retired English association football player
 Matt Ford, television screenwriter for several programs including the Australian television series, Satisfaction
 Matt Ford, aka DJ Format, British hip hop DJ 
 Matt Ford, English businessman who promotes the motorcycle speedway Poole Pirates
 Matt Ford, Australian singer-songwriter who performed as Pinky Beecroft

See also
 Matt Forde (born 1982), English comedian
 Mathew Forde (1785–1837), MP for Down, 1821